Jean-Joseph Zéphirin Gerbe (21 December 1810 in Bras – 26 June 1890 in Bras) was a French naturalist. He was the first to discover the pattern of wing taxis, the absence (diastataxis) or presence (eutaxy) of the fifth secondary in birds.

He was co-author of Ornithologie européenne, ou Catalogue analytique et raisonné des oiseaux observés en Europe with countryman Côme-Damien Degland (second edition, 1867). He also published a French translation of Alfred Brehm's Illustrirtes Thierleben with the title La vie des animaux illustrée : description populaire du règne animal (4 volumes).

Species he described include Gerbe's vole.

Selected works 
 Mélanges zoologiques. Notices et observations sur quelques vertébrés nouveaux pour la faune de la Provence, (1852).
 Ornithologie européenne, ou Catalogue descriptif, analytique et raisonné des oiseaux observés en Europe; with C. D. Degland, (1867).
 Les Oiseaux décrits et figurés d'après la classification de Georges Cuvier, mise au courant des progrès de la science, (1869).
 Étude comparative de quelques caractères du Campagnol ibérien et du Campagnol incertain, (1879).

References

External links
 

1810 births
1890 deaths
French zoologists
French ornithologists
People from Var (department)